is a passenger railway station located in the city of Susaki, Kōchi Prefecture, Japan. It is operated by JR Shikoku and has the station number "K16".

Lines

Layout
The station consists of two opposed side platforms serving two tracks. A station building linked to platform 1 serves as a waiting room. Access to platform 2 across the tracks is by means of ramps and a level crossing. On the other side of platform 1, a siding leads to a freight platform which is used for the loading of sleepers and ballast for track maintenance. The station is unstaffed but a shop sells tickets as a kan'i itaku agent.

Adjacent stations

History
At this time the station was operated by Japanese Government Railways, later becoming Japanese National Railways (JNR). With the privatization of JNR on 1 April 1987, control of the station passed to JR Shikoku.

Surrounding area
Kuwatayama Onsen

See also
 List of Railway Stations in Japan

References

External links

 JR Shikoku timetable

Railway stations in Kōchi Prefecture
Railway stations in Japan opened in 1924
Susaki, Kōchi